is a 1965 novel by Toyoko Yamasaki. It has been adapted into a film in 1966 and then five times as a television series in 1967, 1978, 1990, 2003, and 2019. The 1966 film was entered into the 5th Moscow International Film Festival where it won a Silver Prize.

Summary
The story contrasts the life of two doctors, former classmates and now both associate professors at Naniwa University Hospital in Osaka. The brilliant and ambitious surgeon Goro Zaizen stops at nothing to rise to a position of eminence and authority, while the friendly Shuji Satomi busies himself with his patients and research.

Cast (1966 film)

Cast
Jiro Tamiya - Goro Zaizen
Eijirō Tōno - Professor Azuma
Takahiro Tamura - Shuji Satomi
Eitaro Ozawa - Professor Ugai
Eiji Funakoshi - Professor Kikukawa
Osamu Takizawa - Professor Funao
Kenjiro Ishiyama - Mataichi Zaizen
Yoshi Katō - Professor Ōkouchi
Teruko Kishi - Masako
Mayumi Ogawa - Keiko Hanamori
Shiho Fujimura - Saeko
Toshio Takahara - Tsukuda
Mizuho Suzuki - Hitoshi Sekiguchi

Awards
5th Moscow International Film Festival
Won: Silver Prize
17th Blue Ribbon Awards
Won: Best Film Award
Won: Best Screenplay Award
21st Mainichi Film Award
Won: Best Director Award
Won: Best Screenplay Award

Cast (1967 TV series)
Kei Satō - Goro Zaizen
Jun Negami - Shuji Satomi
Isao Yamagata - Professor Azuma

Cast (1978 TV series)
Jiro Tamiya - Goro Zaizen
Gaku Yamamoto - Shuji Satomi
Nobuo Nakamura - Professor Azuma
Eitaro Ozawa - Professor Ugai
Masakane Yonekura - Professor Kikukawa
Shin Saburi - Professor Funao
Meicho Soganoya - Mataichi Zaizen
Yoshi Katō - Professor Ōkouchi
Kō Nishimura - Kyosuke Takemura
Nobuo Kaneko - Jukichi Iwata
Eiji Okada - Seiichi Satomi
Mieko Azuma - Masako Azuma
Kiyoshi Kodama - Hitoshi Sekiguchi
Kiwako Taichi - Keiko Hanamori
Tamao Nakamura - Yoshie Sasaki
Yoko Shimada - Saeko Azuma
Tanie Kitabayashi - Ume Yamada
Choichiro Kawarazaki - Tomohiro Tsukuda
Iemasa Kayumi - Narrator

Cast (1990 TV mini-series)
Hiroaki Murakami - Goro Zaizen
Mitsuru Hirata - Shuji Satomi
Hideaki Nitani - Professor Azuma

Cast (2003 TV series)
Toshiaki Karasawa - Goro Zaizen
Yōsuke Eguchi - Shuji Satomi
Koji Ishizaka - Professor Azuma
Hideaki Itō - Hiroshi Yanagihara
Masato Ibu - Professor Ugai
Toshiyuki Nishida - Mataichi Zaizen
Mayumi Wakamura - Kyoko Zaizen
Hitomi Kuroki - Keiko Hanamori
Takaya Kamikawa - Hitoshi Sekiguchi
Ikki Sawamura - Professor Kikukawa
Tōru Shinagawa - Professor Ōkouchi
Rino Katase - Yoshie Sasaki
Atsuko Takahata - Masako Azuma
Akiko Yada - Saeko Azuma
Takeo Nakahara - Professor Funao
Takatarō Kataoka - Tomohiro Tsukuda

Cast (2019 TV mini-series)
Junichi Okada - Goro Zaizen
Kenichi Matsuyama - Shuji Satomi
Akira Terao - Professor Azuma
Erika Sawajiri - Keiko Hanamori
Shinnosuke Mitsushima - Masahiro Yanagihara 
Yutaka Matsushige - Professor Ugai
Kaoru Kobayashi - Mataichi Zaizen
Kaho - Kyoko Zaizen
Rie Mimura - Kimiko Kameyama
Mikako Ichikawa - Natsumi Nosaka
Ittoku Kishibe - Professor Ōkouchi
Toshirō Yanagiba - Yōhei Sasaki
Kayoko Kishimoto - Yoshie Sasaki
Kōji Mukai - Yōichi Sasaki
Reiko Takashima - Masako Azuma
Marie Iitoyo - Saeko Azuma
Kippei Shiina - Professor Funao
Norito Yashima - Tomohiro Tsukuda
Takumi Saitoh - Tōru Sekiguchi
Ikusaburo Yamazaki - Kōichirō Kunihira
Wolfgang Riehm as Dr. Wolf

Awards
21st Mainichi Film Award
Won: Best Film

See also

 White Tower (TV series), a 2007 South Korean television drama based on the same novel

References

External links 
 
 

1965 Japanese novels
1966 films
1978 Japanese television series debuts
2003 Japanese television series debuts
2004 Japanese television series endings
2019 Japanese television series debuts
2019 Japanese television series endings
Best Film Kinema Junpo Award winners
Daiei Film films
Films based on Japanese novels
Films directed by Satsuo Yamamoto
Japanese drama television series
Japanese television miniseries
1960s Japanese-language films
Medical literature
Japanese medical television series
Japanese novels adapted into films
Novels set in Japan
Films with screenplays by Shinobu Hashimoto
Films produced by Masaichi Nagata
Fuji TV dramas
1960s Japanese films